Franciscus Johannes Maria (Frank) Boeijen (born 27 November 1957 in Nijmegen) is a Dutch singer and guitarist. His best known songs are Kronenburg Park (Ga die Wereld Uit) about a prostitute, Zwart Wit about the racial murder of Kerwin Duinmeijer in Amsterdam and Twee gezichten about a split personality. Having been in the music business for 25 years, he received the Edison award for his career achievements in 2005.

Biography

Frank Boeijen Groep 
Boeijen grew up in a family of ten children; his older brothers introduced him to Bob Dylan and Neil Young.

In 1979 Boeijen released his first album, a joint effort with Wout Pennings produced by singer Rob de Nijs; Henk Wanders (drums) and Nels Busch (bass) were recruited as backing-musicians. Pennings left due to artistic differences; Will Theunissen (guitar) replaced him, and in November 1979 Frank Boeijen Groep played their first gig.

In 1981 FBG released their self-titled debut album to critical acclaim; OOR magazine was impressed by Boeijen's Herman van Veen-type voice. Leading single Transport uit Bangkok was about a prostitute from Thailand whose name translates as Goldflower (Dutch: "Gouden Bloem"). B-side Verjaardagsfeest, telling that birthday-parties can be boring, received more airplay.
 
In 1982 the band released the aptly-titled second album Twee; keyboard-player Jos Haagmans expanded the line-up.

The breakthrough came in 1983 with the album 1001 Hotel, featuring the Motown-inspired singles Het antwoord en Linda; the latter reached top 10. 1984 began with the release of Zwart Wit, originally intended to chronicle a white Romeo/black Juliet-relationship it became a statement against the racist murder of Kerwin Duinmeijer.

Theunissen left afterwards and was replaced by Maarten Peters for 1985's Foto van een mooie dag. Second single was Kronenburg Park on which Boeijen revisited the prostitute-subject; R&B girl group Mai Tai supplied backing-vocals and released their own version twenty years later. Kronenburg Park (inspired by the Kronenburgerpark) was also released in English as Round Midnight with lyrics by Golden Earring-frontman Barry Hay ("You've always been the mistress of bad luck, making love for another lousy buck").

In 1986 FBG released In Natura, the first in a trilogy of In-albums. Joined by new guitarist Ger Hoeijmakers, FBG went back to basics by using less synthesizers and adding the occasional sax and percussion to the mix. They also traded clubs for theatres, which was unusual at the time. The trilogy was completed by Welkom in Utopia and Dans In Slow Motion.

1990 began with the chart-success of Zeg Me Dat Het Niet Zo Is, a ballad about (not) coping with the loss of a beloved one. The same year FBG  celebrated their 10th anniversary by releasing Hier komt de storm, a live-retrospective with the added bonus of new studio-tracks including the Bob Dylan-tribute Robert Zimmerman. A major tour followed which lasted till March 30, 1991. FBG disbanded afterwards, as Boeijen felt that  the group had reached the end of its potential.

Solo career 
Boeijen became a solo-artist; he continued to work with Hoeijmakers and recruited drummer Norman Bonink (now playing for BLØF) among others. He staged successful tours in both the Netherlands and Belgium. His 26th album was released in 2017.

Personal life 
Frank Boeijen has been married to Amanda Redington between 1990 and 1994.

External links 
  

1957 births
Dutch male singers
Dutch pop singers
Living people
People from Nijmegen